Enrique García Ojeda (born January 21, 1972 in Los Corrales de Buelna, Cantabria) is a Spanish rally driver, who won the 2007 Intercontinental Rally Challenge (IRC).

A regular competitor in Spanish rallies, including Rally Catalunya, Ojeda entered rounds of the first season of the IRC in 2006 as a Peugeot Sport España driver, in a Peugeot 206 S1600, with a best finish of seventh on the Ypres Rally. In 2007, Peugeot Sport España began running the Peugeot 207 S2000, which Ojeda drove to five podium finishes in the seven rounds he started, scoring points on all seven. Despite not winning an event, he was able to beat teammate Nicolas Vouilloz and the Abarth drivers to the title.

Kronos Racing and Peugeot Bel-Lux took over the running of the 207 S2000s in 2008, meaning Ojeda and Peugeot Sport España only entered two rounds, finishing fourth on Rally Príncipe de Asturias. He was able to win the Spanish Tarmac Championship. He began driving for Subaru in 2009.

IRC results

References

Living people
1972 births
Intercontinental Rally Challenge drivers
Rally drivers from Cantabria
European Rally Championship drivers
Spanish rally drivers
Peugeot Sport drivers